Mirna Khaled Abdulaal is an Egyptian journalist and writer who publish news articles to Egyptian Streets. In March 2021, she received the Cairo Climate Talks Award during the Cairo Climate Talks event for her article Locked Out: How Bedouins in Egypt's Sinai Are Coping With COVID-19 Crisis which was based on Sinai Peninsula. She was awarded in recognition of her outstanding environmental journalism for the year 2020.

References 

21st-century Egyptian women writers
Living people
Egyptian editors
Egyptian women journalists
Year of birth missing (living people)